Sideridis rivularis, the campion, is a species of moth of the family Noctuidae. It is found in from the northern part of the Iberian Peninsula, through the whole of Europe. To the east, it is found in Central Asia and Siberia, up to Manchuria. To the south, it is found in the Mediterranean Sea region (with the exception of Greece) and parts of Asia Minor. In the Alps, it is found at up to 1,600 metres above sea level.

Technical description and variation

The wingspan is 27–30 mm. The length of the forewings is 14–16 mm. Forewing brownish fuscous with a violet sheen; the lines double; claviform stigma large, black; orbicular and reniform grey with yellowish or whitish outlines, conversely oblique and contiguous on median vein; veins dark outlined with grey; submarginal line yellowish or white, dentate; hindwing brownish fuscous, darker in female: the ab. behenis Frr. has the outer half of costa of forewing pale; — S. mandarina Leech (now considered to be a species) from Japan and China, is rather larger and darker, the markings in consequence somewhat less distinct.

Biology
The moth flies from April to September depending on the location. There are two generations per year.

Larva greenish grey or yellowish, dotted with white: dorsal line dark with a row of oblique reddish grey stripes on each side. At first, they feed on the flowers and seed-capsules, eating the seeds, later they also feed on the leaves.

References

External links
 Lepiforum
Funet Taxonomy
Fauna Europaea
Vlindernet 
waarneming.nl 
Lepidoptera of Belgium
Campion at UKmoths

Hadenini
Moths described in 1775
Moths of Asia
Moths of Europe
Taxa named by Johan Christian Fabricius